The goalball men's tournament was contested from 25 August to 3 September. There were ten teams consisting of six players split into two groups: Group A and Group B.

Defending Paralympic champions Lithuania failed to defend the title after a semi-final defeat to eventual champions Brazil, they ended up with bronze medal.

Participating teams

Group A

Group B

Preliminary rounds

Group A

Group B

Knock-out stage

Bracket

Quarter-finals

Semi-finals

Bronze medal match

Gold medal match

References

Goalball at the 2020 Summer Paralympics